Pink Peacock (Yiddish:) is a café and infoshop in the Govanhill area of Glasgow. Described by its founders as "the only queer Yiddish anarchist vegan pay-what-you-can café in the world"  and "anti-Zionist", it opened physically in 2021 after being delayed by the COVID-19 pandemic.

Establishment 

Pink Peacock was founded by Morgan Holleb and Joe Isaac, both active participants in Irn-Ju, a Jewish anarchist collective in Scotland. The founders formed plans to open a queer and Yiddish café in 2019. They were motivated by the lack of queer and Jewish spaces in Govanhill, and the lack of Yiddish spaces in Scotland; the café is the country's first physical Yiddish-focused space to open in decades.

In July 2020, Pink Peacock campaigned to crowdfund £10,000 to cover the costs of running the café for three months. They successfully raised a total of £15,885 by the end of the campaign in August 2020.

The COVID-19 pandemic disrupted the planned opening of the café. During the COVID-19 lockdowns, Isaac and Holleb distributed packages of food in Govanhill and organized various queer and Jewish online events.

Operation 

Pink Peacock operates on a pay-what-you-can model, telling customers the break-even price but allowing them to pay any amount. The café is alcohol-free and vegan, and has a community fridge outside the café stocked with food. In addition to food, they sell what Jewish Currents described in 2021 as "Jewish lefty merch". The café is run as a cooperative by workers and community members.

Use of Yiddish 
Pink Peacock maintains a Yiddish version of its website, and uses the language on Twitter, unlike many other Yiddish-focused organizations. In a 2020 article for the Jewish Telegraphic Agency, Holleb explained that "Yiddish is a way of connecting with a Jewish language that isn’t modern Hebrew. There isn’t Yiddish nationhood. It is a diasporic language."

Anti-police policy and tote bags 
In June 2021, Pink Peacock was the subject of reporting in the tabloid The Scottish Sun, which criticised their policy of "no cops, no terfs". Subsequently, the café's storefront was vandalised when a man painted over it.  The cafe had also experienced vandalism a month prior to these events, in May 2021 when a window had been smashed in an incident which also saw windows broken in adjacent branches of Farmfoods and Semichem. Additionally, the coverage led to a complaint about the café displaying in its window a pink tote bag with the words "fuck the police" in English and Yiddish, which in turn led Police Scotland to visit Holleb and Isaac's home. Holleb was subsequently charged with breach of the peace, and Glasgow police seized one of the tote bags from Pink Peacock as evidence. After the seizure, which was publicized in local media and on Pink Peacock's Twitter account, the café sold out of the bags.

Handcuff key sales 
On 30 September, the café launched the sale of universal handcuff keys. They were met with criticism online as this coincided with the sentencing of a police officer convicted of the murder of Sarah Everard after falsely arresting her and restraining her in handcuffs. The café later issued a statement claiming the keys had been promoted with the upcoming 2021 United Nations Climate Change Conference protests in mind and not the Sarah Everard case and said the timing was insensitive.

References

External links 
 
 
 "why we say 'fuck the police': a statement from pink peacock די ראָזעווע פּאַווע", Av 5781 (July 2021)

2019 establishments in Scotland
Anarchist collectives
Anarchist organisations in the United Kingdom
Ashkenazi Jewish culture in Scotland
Bilingualism
Crowdfunding projects
Govanhill and Crosshill
LGBT anarchism
LGBT culture in Glasgow
LGBT collectives
LGBT Jewish organizations
Infoshops
Jewish anarchism
Jewish anti-Zionism in the United Kingdom
Jewish organisations based in the United Kingdom
Jews and Judaism in Scotland
Restaurants in Glasgow
Worker co-operatives of the United Kingdom
Yiddish culture in the United Kingdom
Coffeehouses and cafés in the United Kingdom
Vegan restaurants
Veganism in the United Kingdom